Walter Paul Dürst (28 February 1927 – 2 May 2016) was an ice hockey player for the Swiss national team. He won a bronze medal at the 1948 Winter Olympics.

References 

1927 births
2016 deaths
Ice hockey players at the 1948 Winter Olympics
Ice hockey players at the 1952 Winter Olympics
Medalists at the 1948 Winter Olympics
Olympic bronze medalists for Switzerland
Olympic ice hockey players of Switzerland
Olympic medalists in ice hockey
Place of birth missing